Bowland Forest Low is a civil parish in Ribble Valley, Lancashire, England.  It contains 28 listed buildings that are recorded in the National Heritage List for England.  Of these, one is listed at Grade I, the highest of the three grades, one is at Grade II*, the middle grade, and the others are at Grade II, the lowest grade.  The parish contains the settlements of Whitewell and Cow Ark, and is otherwise almost completely rural.  The most important building in the parish is Browsholme Hall; this and a number of associated structures are listed.  Most of the other listed buildings are houses and associated structures, farmhouses, and farm buildings.  The River Hodder passes along the boundary of the parish, and two bridges crossing it are listed.  Also listed are a church, a folly, a former smithy, a limekiln, and a hotel.

Key

Buildings

References

Citations

Sources

Lists of listed buildings in Lancashire
Buildings and structures in Ribble Valley